Ambalathara is a suburb of Thiruvananthapuram, the capital of Kerala, India. It is situated between Paravankunnu and Thiruvallam.

Location
Ambalathara is 5 km from the city centre. Privately owned KSRTC buses plying the Kovalam route from East Fort pass through Ambalathara. A bypass of National Highway 47 passes 2 km to the west of Ambalathara. The nearest railway station is Thiruvananthapuram Central, about 4 km away. The nearest airport is Thiruvananthapuram International Airport, approximately 5 km away. Ambalathara is a bustling residential region situated on the route from East Fort to Thiruvallam, in Thiruvananthapuram. The 2000-year-old Thiruvallam Sree Parasurama Temple at Thiruvallam is 2 km from Ambalathara. The famous Pazhanchira Devi Temple is 1 km distant. There are many elite residential settlements in the area. The 'Kumarichanda' fish and vegetable market is open 16 hours a day, including hartal days. It is situated near the NH bypass.

Religion
The population of Ambalathara mainly practices Hinduism, Islam and Christianity.

Government institutions
 Milma Dairy, Ambalathara is situated just 1 km away from Ambalathara Junction.
 KSEB Office, Ambalathara
 The New India Assurance Com Ltd (portal Office 9074685104)

Banks
 State Bank of India
 Indian Bank 
 Muthoot Finance Bank 
 Central Bank of India
 Bank of Baroda
 Muttathara Co-op Society

Schools
 Govt UPS, Ambalathara
 Cordova Public School, near the NH 47 Bypass, Ambalathara
 City Nursery School, Ambalathara
 St. Philomina's G.H.S.S

Colleges
National college of arts and science.

Hospitals
 Al Arif Hospital
 S.R Hospital Ambalathara

Temples
 Sri Pazhanchira Devi Temple, Ambalathara
 Sri Ujjaini Mahakali Amman Temple
 Shiva Temple, Ambalathara
 Sri Mathavil Marutha Temple, Ambalathara
 Sri Vedanthara Temple, Ambalathara
 Pattanamkara Thamburam Temple, Ambalathara
 Hanumankavu, Ambalathara
 Sree Alukadu Devi Temple, 1 km from Ambalathara

References

External links
 
 
 

Suburbs of Thiruvananthapuram